The national teams format, which had been in use before the Second World War, was used again in the 1947 Tour de France. The German team was not invited, and the Italian team was made up out of Franco-Italians living in France, as the peace treaty between France and Italy was not yet official, so the countries were technically still in war.
The Tour organisers invited ten teams of ten cyclists each. Besides the Italian team, there was also a French team and a Belgian team, and a combined Swiss/Luxembourgian team The plan was to have a joint Dutch-British team, but the Dutch cyclists protested because the British cyclists were too inexperienced, and the British cyclists were replaced by "French strangers".
There were also five French regional teams: Ile de France, West France, North East France, Center/South West France and South East France.

There were 58 French cyclists, 13 Italian, 11 Belgian, 6 Dutch, 6 Swiss, 4 Luxembourg, 1 Polish and 1 Algerian cyclist. Of the 100 cyclists, 53 finished the race.

Start list

By team

By rider

By nationality

References

1947 Tour de France
1947